The Vet's Daughter is a 1959 novel by English author Barbara Comyns.

Premise
Alice Rowlands is the daughter of a South London veterinarian in the Edwardian era. Alice's father is a bully who rules their repressed house through terror. Alice's frail mother dies and is swiftly replaced in the family home by her father's brash and sexually savvy new girlfriend. The confusion and abuse heaped on Alice combined with her ultimate optimism lead to her discovering her own occult powers, with disastrous results. The quality of the writing and of that "innocent eye which observes with childlike simplicity the most fantastic or the most ominous occurrence" was praised by Graham Greene.

History 
Barbara Comyns dreamt the idea for The Vet's Daughter whilst on honeymoon in a Welsh cottage lent to her and her new husband by the Soviet agent Kim Philby in 1945. The novel was not to be completed for some years and was first published by Heinemann in 1959. In 1978 the novel was used as the basis for the musical The Clapham Wonder, directed by Sandy Wilson. It was republished by Virago in 1981 and has been reprinted several times since then. The story was read by Susannah Harker for BBC Radio.

Reception 
In 2019, the book was featured on the BBC Radio 4 programme A Good Read, where it was described as "suburban gothic meets magical realism".

Avril Horner writing in 2021 for TLS. Times Literary Supplement noted that that  the book is "now considered by many to be her finest novel" and received "many enthusiastic reviews".

Notes

1959 British novels
English novels
Novels set in London
Heinemann (publisher) books
British novels adapted into plays